Hypacanthium is a genus of Asian flowering plants in the thistle tribe within the sunflower family.

 Species
 Hypacanthium echinopifolium (Bornm.) Juz. - Kazakhstan, Uzbekistan, Kyrgyzstan
 Hypacanthium evidens Tscherneva - Uzbekistan

References

Cynareae
Asteraceae genera